Sergio Rojas Carmona (born 24 January 1968) is a Mexican politician from the Party of the Democratic Revolution. From 2006 to 2009 he served as a Deputy of the LX Legislature of the Mexican Congress representing the State of Mexico.

References

1968 births
Living people
Politicians from the State of Mexico
Party of the Democratic Revolution politicians
21st-century Mexican politicians
Deputies of the LX Legislature of Mexico
Members of the Chamber of Deputies (Mexico) for the State of Mexico